Amy deLone (born October 8, 1968) is a former professional tennis player from the United States.

Biography
Growing up in Lincoln, Massachusetts, deLone attended the nearby Concord Academy. She played collegiate tennis for Harvard University, then after graduating in 1991 turned professional.

In 1993 and 1994 she featured on the WTA Tour, as a doubles specialist. Her doubles partner was younger sister Erika deLone. The pair were runners-up at the Indonesian Women's Open in 1993, competing as qualifiers.

At the 1993 US Open, the deLone sisters made it past their first round match against the 12th seeded Maleeva sisters, Magdalena and Manuela, who had to retire hurt in the first set.

WTA Tour finals

Doubles (0-1)

References

External links
 
 

1968 births
Living people
American female tennis players
Harvard Crimson women's tennis players
Tennis people from Massachusetts
People from Lincoln, Massachusetts
Sportspeople from Middlesex County, Massachusetts